Open Hearing is an Australian television program which aired 1960 to 1961 on ABC. Hosted by Malcolm Mackay, it was a panel discussion program in which topical subject matters would be discussed. The first episode aired 29 August 1960.

In one episode, the topic was What is the Future of New Guinea, while in another episode the topic was How can we develop the north of Australia.

References

External links

1960 Australian television series debuts
1961 Australian television series endings
Australian Broadcasting Corporation original programming
Australian television talk shows
Black-and-white Australian television shows
English-language television shows